David Copperfield is a 1969 British-American international co-production television film directed by Delbert Mann based on the 1850 novel of the same name by Charles Dickens, adapted by Jack Pulman. The film was released in the UK in 1970. It stars Robin Phillips in the title role and Ralph Richardson as Micawber, and features well-known actors Richard Attenborough, Laurence Olivier, Susan Hampshire, Cyril Cusack, Wendy Hiller, Edith Evans, Michael Redgrave and Ron Moody.

Plot
Charles Dickens's story of a young man's journey to maturity. This version finds David Copperfield (Robin Phillips) as a young man, brooding on a deserted beach. In flashback, David remembers his life in 19th century England, as a young orphan, brought to London and passed around from relatives, to guardians, to boarding school. He relives his struggle to overcome the loss of his idyllic childhood and the torment inflicted by his hated stepfather after his mother's death. Then virtually abandoned on the streets of Victorian London, David Copperfield is flung into manhood and contends bravely with the perils of big-city corruption and vice; hardships which ultimately fuel his triumph as a talented and successful writer.

Cast
Richard Attenborough as Mr. Tungay
Cyril Cusack as Barkis
Edith Evans as Betsy Trotwood
Pamela Franklin as Dora Spenlow
Susan Hampshire as Agnes Wickfield
Wendy Hiller as Emma Micawber
Ron Moody as Uriah Heep
Laurence Olivier as Mr. Creakle
Alistair Mackenzie as David Copperfield as a child.
Robin Phillips as David Copperfield
Michael Redgrave as Daniel Peggotty
Ralph Richardson as Wilkins Micawber
Emlyn Williams as Mr. Dick
Sinéad Cusack as Emily
James Donald as Edward Murdstone
James Hayter as Porter
Megs Jenkins as Clara Peggotty
Anna Massey as Jane Murdstone
Andrew McCulloch as Ham Peggotty
Nicholas Pennell as Thomas Traddles
Corin Redgrave as James Steerforth
Isobel Black as Clara Copperfield
Liam Redmond as Mr. Quinion

Production
It was made in the UK for 20th Century Fox Television with some exteriors filmed in Suffolk, and interior scenes filmed at The Swan Hotel in Southwold.

The music score was the last Malcolm Arnold wrote for a film.

Release
The film was made to be shown on television in the United States, but was released to cinemas in the United Kingdom and elsewhere.

The film had its premiere at the Carlton Haymarket in London on 2 January 1970. It opened at Studio One and on the Rank Organisation's circuit in North London on 4 January 1970.

DVD release
The film is available on a variety of budget label DVDs, but all of them are very poor-quality transfers.

References

External links
 
 
 

1969 films
1969 television films
1969 drama films
British drama films
Television shows based on David Copperfield
Films based on David Copperfield
Films shot at Pinewood Studios
Films directed by Delbert Mann
Films scored by Malcolm Arnold
20th Century Fox Television films
1960s English-language films
1960s British films